Emmons Creek is a stream in the U.S. state of Wisconsin. It empties into Long Lake. Emmons Creek most likely was named after the local Emmons family; an earlier name was "Robinson's Creek".

References

Rivers of Wisconsin
Rivers of Portage County, Wisconsin
Rivers of Waupaca County, Wisconsin